Judge Rubin may refer to:

Alvin Benjamin Rubin (1920–1991), judge of the United States Court of Appeals for the Fifth Circuit
Carl Bernard Rubin (1920–1995), judge of the United States District Court for the Southern District of Ohio
Julie Rubin (born 1972), judge of the United States District Court for the District of Maryland